The 1900 Buffalo football team represented the University of Buffalo as an independent during the 1900 college football season. The team had no coach and the team was 1–1–2 against collegiate foes and 3–2–2 overall for the year.

Schedule

References

Buffalo
Buffalo Bulls football seasons
Buffalo football